MS Sea Wind is a Ro-Ro and passenger ship, which operated on the Vuosaari–Muuga route. The ship was built in 1972 Helsingørs Skipsværft dock in Helsingør. The vessel is registered under the Liberian flag.

Description
The engines are connected in pairs, each pair driving a variable-pitch screw propeller. She had accommodation for 36 passengers and 600 lane metres of vehicle accommodation.

She had accommodation for 77 passengers. Following the vessel's rebuild by Seebeckwerft, Bremerhaven, she had accommodation for 220 passengers.

She had 1,270 metres of vehicle accommodation.

History
Svealand was ordered in 1969 by Linjebuss International, Svea, Stockholm and built as yard number 397 by Helsingør Skibsværft, Helsingør, Denmark. She entered service with Stockholms Rederi AB / Trave Line on the Helsingborg–Travemünde route. She was transferred to Saga Line in October 1976, continuing to be employed on the Helsingborg–Travemünde route. Saga Line became TT-Saga Line on 1 January 1981, during which year Svealand was transferred  to the Trelleborg–Travemünde route. On 25 November 1981, she was sold to Johnson Line. During April and May 1982, she was rebuilt by Howaldtswerke-Deutsche Werft, Kiel, West Germany.

On 28 December 1982, Svealand was sold to Svenska Landfils, Stockholm. On 7 January 1983, she was sold to Scandinavian Ferry Line, Helsingborg. She was renamed Saga Wind on 22 September 1984 and re-entered service on the Trelleborg–Travemünde route. Scandinavian Ferry Line was renamed Swecarrier Rederi on 8 December 1986. In that month, she was rebuilt by Seebeckwerft of Bremerhaven, West Germany to give her more cabins.

On 29 January 1989, Saga Wind arrived at Blohm & Voss, Hamburg, West Germany for rebuilding as a train ferry. She was chartered to Sea Wind Line, Stockholm in April 1989 and was renamed Sea Wind on 18 April. She was placed on the Stockholm–Turku route. On 5 January 1992, she was sold to  Silja OY, operating under the management of Sweferry.

On 5 March 1997, Sea Wind ran aground off Mjölkö. Her passengers were evacuated by the Waxholmsbolaget ferry . She was refloated the next day and taken into Stockholm. Following repairs, she returned to service in April. In July 1997, she was placed on the Stockholm–Långnäs–Turku route. In 2001, her bridge was rebuilt. On 1 January 2008, she returned to the Stockholm–Turku route. On 8 September 2008, she  was sold to Tallink Swedish Line, Cyprus. The cause was a broken oil line. Her eleven passengers were evacuated by a Finnish helicopter. The ship was towed into Turku, where she arrived on 3 December. She returned to service in January 2009. Sea Wind was withdrawn from the Stockholm–Turku route on 21 December 2014 and laid up at Naantali.

Sea Wind was transferred to the Estonian flag in January 2015. She entered service on the Tallinn–Vuosaari route on 8 January. In 2022 , Sea Wind changed flag from the Estonian flag to the Cameroon flag.

References

1971 ships
Ships built in Helsingør
Ferries of Sweden
Ferries of Estonia
Train ferries
Maritime incidents in 1997
Maritime incidents in 2008